"Slide Away" is a song by the English rock band Oasis, taken from their debut studio album Definitely Maybe (1994). It was written by lead guitarist Noel Gallagher and serves as the tenth track on the album.

Composition and recording

Writing
Noel Gallagher claims he wrote it on a Les Paul guitar that Johnny Marr sent to him, since he had few guitars available to him at the time. On the Definitely Maybe DVD, he also notes that he took Marr's guitar out of the case, sat down, and "the song wrote itself". Gallagher wrote it about his girlfriend at the time – Louise Jones and the song was written about their stormy relationship. He described them as "soulmates" and when they finally split up in June 1994, Noel said 'I don't think I'll ever get over it.'

Recording
During the recording of Definitely Maybe, there was an argument between Gallagher and rhythm guitarist Paul "Bonehead" Arthurs. Gallagher was taken to the pub by bassist Paul "Guigsy" McGuigan where he calmed down, had a few drinks, went back to the studios and recorded "Slide Away".

The song was recorded during the initial Monnow Valley Studio sessions, and produced by Dave Batchelor. During recording, Batchelor stood in front of drummer Tony McCarroll and pointed at each of his two crash cymbals in turn, to make sure that McCarroll alternated the cymbals across the stereo image.

Batchelor and the band had an argument about the song's tempo, which was ultimately ended by the suggestion of engineer Dave Scott. The band completed the final take afterwards, but Batchelor was angered and fired Scott over the incident. Scott was later informed by Mark Coyle that "Slide Away" was the only song kept from the Monnow Valley sessions, after being remixed by Owen Morris.

Style
Recalling the style of "Slide Away", Alex Niven wrote that the song "adopts the classic grunge technique" by combining a "heavy rock base with a melody that alludes to Neil Young and the Beatles".

In an interview on the bonus DVD of Stop the Clocks, Gallagher comments that the track contains his brother Liam's best ever singing.

Release
It is featured on their debut album Definitely Maybe, on the "Whatever" single, and on the "Champagne Supernova" US single. Also in the Stop the Clocks interview, Noel claimed that he was told to release it as a fifth single from Definitely Maybe, but Gallagher refused, arguing, "You can't have five [singles] off a debut album." Furthermore, it is claimed to be Paul McCartney's favourite song by Oasis in the same interview. A limited edition UK promotional CD was pressed to celebrate the band's success at the 1995 Brit Awards. The song is included on Oasis' best-of album Stop the Clocks in a slightly different mix; Noel's backing vocals during the bridge have been removed, and it's this version that has been included in reissues of Definitely Maybe since.

Live performances
Both of the Gallagher brothers claimed that the song should have been played more often at concerts, and although it was rarely played, it remains a fan favourite. However, it was included on the set list of the band's Dig Out Your Soul Tour. It was described by guitarist Gem Archer as "the one for the fans".

A live version recorded on 17 April 1995 at the Southend Cliffs Pavilion was included on the video album, Live by the Sea.
A live version of the song was released in 2007 on the live album The Dreams We Have As Children by Noel Gallagher.
Liam Gallagher has performed the song at his solo performances, most notably at the Glastonbury Festival and Reading and Leeds Festivals in 2017.

Reception
While reviewing the Definitely Maybe album, NME writer Keith Cameron described "Slide Away" as "a completely heart-rending love song" that showed the band possessing "both the sweetness and tenderness to complement their well-proven hooligan qualities." Gibson Guitar.com listed the song as one of a ten of Noel's best guitar tracks. In the 11 May 2013 edition of NME, the song was listed at number 57 in the magazine's "The 100 Greatest Britpop Songs" list, and in 2019, it was ranked number 1 in a list of greatest Oasis songs by the same magazine.

Personnel
Liam Gallagher – lead vocals, tambourine
Noel Gallagher – lead guitars, bass, backing vocals
Paul Arthurs – rhythm guitar
Tony McCarroll – drums

Certifications

References

External links
"Slide Away" song review at AllMusic

Oasis (band) songs
Rock ballads
Grunge songs
Songs written by Noel Gallagher
1994 songs
Creation Records singles
1990s ballads